Sarah Vaughan (1924–1990) was an American jazz singer.

Sarah Vaughan, or variant spellings thereof, may also refer to :

People
Sarah Vaughan (writer) (born 1972), British writer and journalist
Sara Vaughn (athlete) (born 1986), American middle-distance runner

Albums
Sarah Vaughan (1950 album), with George Treadwell and His All Stars, for Columbia
Sarah Vaughan (1955 album), with Clifford Brown, for EmArcy
Sarah Vaughan (1970 album), album on Everest Records

See also
Sarah von Lahnstein, fictional character on the German soap opera Verbotene Liebe (Forbidden Love)